"Trust Me to Open My Mouth" was the second single released in the UK from Squeeze's seventh album, Babylon and On. It reached number 72 in the UK Singles Chart.

In North America, this song was not released as a single. Instead, "853-5937" was the second single from Babylon and On in Canada and the US.

Track listing
7"
 "Trust Me to Open My Mouth" (3:13)
 "Take Me I'm Yours" (live) (4:01)

12"
 "Trust Me to Open My Mouth" (remix) (4:30)
 "Take Me I'm Yours" (live) (4:01)
 "Trust Me to Open My Mouth" (3:13)
 "Black Coffee in Bed" (live) (6:31)

References

External links
Squeeze discography at Squeezenet

Squeeze (band) songs
1987 singles
Songs written by Glenn Tilbrook
Songs written by Chris Difford
1987 songs
A&M Records singles